Roma is a town in Northern Peru in Casa Grande District of Ascope Province in the region La Libertad. This town is located some 44 km north of Trujillo city in the agricultural Chicama Valley.

See also
Ascope Province
Chavimochic
Virú Valley
Virú
Moche valley

External links
Location of Roma by Wikimapia

References

  

Populated places in La Libertad Region